Frank Kelly (1938–2016),  was an Irish actor

Frank Kelly may also refer to:
Frank Kelly (footballer, born 1892) (1892–1919), Scottish footballer
Frank Kelly (footballer, born 1910) (1910–1982), Australian rules footballer for Collingwood, Melbourne, Essendon and St Kilda
Frank Kelly (footballer, born 1921) (1921–1974), Australian rules footballer for Footscray
Frank Kelly (footballer, born 1950) (1950–2006), Australian rules footballer for Richmond
Frank Kelly (mathematician) (born 1950), University of Cambridge professor
Frank J Kelly, air pollution scientist

See also
Francis Kelly (disambiguation)
Frank Kelley (disambiguation)